SOA Repository Artifact Model & Protocol (S-RAMP) is a specification of SOA repository released by HP, IBM, Software AG, TIBCO, and Red Hat. The SOA repository provides environments for designing, running and monitoring services. The repository manages artifacts like schemas (e.g. XML Schema or RELAX NG), service descriptions (e.g. WSDL), business process definitions (e.g. BPEL) and policies (e.g. WS-Policy). The SOA Repository Artifact Model and Protocol (S-RAMP) defines a common data model for SOA repositories as well as an interaction protocol to facilitate the use of common tooling and sharing of data. This ATOM binding specifications documents the syntax for interaction with a compliant repository for create, read, update, delete and query operations. The S-RAMP specification promotes interoperability of SOA Repositories. The S-RAMP specification is one of the SOA standards.

The current version is 1.0. 
S-RAMP is supported by a Technical Committee at OASIS.

Red Hat's Open Source Artificer Project  fully implements the S-RAMP specification and is considered to be the de facto Reference Implementation. Everything you ever wanted to know about S-RAMP but were afraid to ask demos Artificer and explains S-RAMP concepts.

SOA Repository 
Although the S-RAMP specification is a specification for a SOA Repository it does not actually specify much about the repository itself. Instead the specification is written to promote interoperability across all portions of the service lifecycle between Design Time, Run Time and Monitoring systems and tooling. The design adheres to design goals such as the use of existing standards, vendor neutrality and it is driven by use cases. The specification separates out the data model from the bindings that describe the interaction APIs clients use to interact with the repository.

Artifact Model 
An S-RAMP repository stores all SOA content but more importantly metadata about each piece of content. An artifact in S-RAMP is a container for all of the metadata that describes it. There are 4 types of S-RAMP artifacts:
 Document Artifact: correspond to a physical document stored in the repository. Several important document types are pre-defined and have special support in S-RAMP (such as XML Schema or WSDL documents)
 Logical Model Artifact:  provide a representation of one of the pre-defined logical models (e.g. the WSDL model or Service Implementation model).
 Derived Artifact: correspond to data derived by the S-RAMP server from the content of an artifact. Derived content is read-only and provide detailed information about the artifact. This information is standard through the use of the Logical Models defined in the specification.
 Extended Artifact: artifact models not pre-defined by the S-RAMP specification. Extended models may become part of the core specification in future versions of S-RAMP.
S-RAMP defines a hierarchical classification system based on the Web Ontology Language (OWL) and a query language based on XPath 2.0.

Atom Binding 
The S-RAMP binding specification details how artifacts are represented in ATOM (standard) format, as well as how to perform create, retrieve, update, delete operations against the data in an S-RAMP compliant repository. The use of an existing REST based format such as the ATOM facilitates integration with existing products using ATOM feeds.

See also
 SOA
 SOA Repository
 SOA Governance
 SOA Lifecycle
 UDDI

References

External links
 SOA Repository Artifact Model & Protocol Official Site
 S-RAMP on IBM's developerWorks
 Overlord S-RAMP is an Apache 2.0 Licensed Open Source implementation, which is part of the governance solution of Fuse Service Works
 Video: S-RAMP-101  - Everything you ever wanted to know about S-RAMP but were afraid to ask

Service-oriented (business computing)